Africoseiulus is a genus of mites in the Phytoseiidae family.

Species
 Africoseiulus namibianus (Ueckermann, 1988)

References

Phytoseiidae